Balbastro is a station on the Buenos Aires Premetro. It was opened on 29 April 1987 together with the other Premetro stations.

References

Buenos Aires PreMetro stations
Buenos Aires Underground stations